The 1999 NAPA Autocare 500 was the 28th stock car race of the 1999 NASCAR Winston Cup Series season and the 51st iteration of the event. The race was held on Sunday, October 3, 1999, before an audience of 62,000 in Martinsville, Virginia at Martinsville Speedway, a  permanent oval-shaped short track. The race took the scheduled 500 laps to complete. Within the final laps of the race, Hendrick Motorsports driver Jeff Gordon was able to hold off the field on the final restart with 19 to go to take his 48th career NASCAR Winston Cup Series victory and his sixth victory of the season. To fill out the top three, Richard Childress Racing driver Dale Earnhardt and Joe Bessey Racing driver Geoff Bodine would finish second and third, respectively.

Background 

Martinsville Speedway is an NASCAR-owned stock car racing track located in Henry County, in Ridgeway, Virginia, just to the south of Martinsville. At 0.526 miles (0.847 km) in length, it is the shortest track in the NASCAR Cup Series. The track was also one of the first paved oval tracks in NASCAR, being built in 1947 by H. Clay Earles. It is also the only remaining race track that has been on the NASCAR circuit from its beginning in 1948.

Entry list 

 (R) denotes rookie driver.

Practice

First practice 
The first practice session was held on Friday, October 1, at 11:00 AM EST. The session would last for two hours and 30 minutes.

Second practice 
The second practice session was held on Saturday, October 2, at 9:40 AM EST. The session would last for 50 minutes.

Final practice 
The final practice session, sometimes referred to as Happy Hour, was held on Saturday, October 2, after the preliminary 1999 Goody's Body Pain 200 NASCAR Featherlite Modified Series race. The session would last for one hour.

Qualifying 
Qualifying was split into two rounds. The first round was held on Friday, October 1, at 3:00 PM EST. Each driver would have two laps to set a fastest time; the fastest of the two would count as their official qualifying lap. During the first round, the top 25 drivers in the round would be guaranteed a starting spot in the race. If a driver was not able to guarantee a spot in the first round, they had the option to scrub their time from the first round and try and run a faster lap time in a second round qualifying run, held on Saturday, October 2, at 11:15 PM EST. As with the first round, each driver would have two laps to set a fastest time; the fastest of the two would count as their official qualifying lap. Positions 26-36 would be decided on time, while positions 37-43 would be based on provisionals. Six spots are awarded by the use of provisionals based on owner's points. The seventh is awarded to a past champion who has not otherwise qualified for the race. If no past champion needs the provisional, the next team in the owner points will be awarded a provisional.

Four drivers would fail to qualify: Ron Hornaday Jr., Dick Trickle, Tim Fedewa, and Morgan Shepherd.

Full qualifying results

Race results

References 

1999 NASCAR Winston Cup Series
NASCAR races at Martinsville Speedway
October 1999 sports events in the United States
1999 in sports in Virginia